Alexandr Dolgopolov and Xavier Malisse defeated Roger Federer and Stanislas Wawrinka in the final, 6–4, 6–7(5–7), [10–7] to win the men's doubles tennis title at the 2011 Indian Wells Masters.

Marc López and Rafael Nadal were the defending champions, but lost in the semifinals to Federer and Wawrinka.

Seeds

Draw

Finals

Top half

Bottom half

References
Main Draw

BNP Paribas Open – Men's Doubles
2011 BNP Paribas Open